The North-Eastern Areas (Reorganisation) Act, 1971 was a major reform of the boundaries of India's North-East region into States and union territories.

Effect of the changes
Source:
 Establishment of the states of Manipur and Tripura. They were Union Territories before.
 Establishment of the state of Meghalaya. It was an autonomous part of Assam before.
 Establishment of the Union Territories of Mizoram and Arunachal Pradesh.
 Reduction of the area of the state of Assam due to the above changes.
 Allocation of Lok Sabha and Rajya Sabha seats for the newly created territories.
 Allocation of seats to the Legislative Assemblies of the newly created territories.
 Creation of separate High Courts for Meghalya, Manipur and Tripura.
 Creation of a new, common High Court for the rest of the modified territories

Later Territorial changes
 Following the Mizoram Peace Accord in 1986, Mizoram was given full-statehood in 1987.
 Arunachal Pradesh was given full statehood in by the State of Arunachal Pradesh Act, 1986.

See also
States Reorganisation Act, 1956
Punjab Reorganisation Act, 1966
Bihar Reorganisation Act, 2000
Madhya Pradesh Reorganisation Act, 2000
Uttar Pradesh Reorganisation Act, 2000
Andhra Pradesh Reorganisation Act, 2014
Administrative divisions of India
States and union territories of India
Indian Constitution
Jammu and Kashmir Reorganisation Act, 2019

References

External links
Text of the Act

Acts of the Parliament of India 1971
Indira Gandhi administration
Reorganisation of Indian states
Indian legislation
1971 in law